A face transplant is a medical procedure to replace all or part of a person's face using tissue from a donor. Part
of a field called "Vascularized Composite Tissue Allotransplantation" (VCA) it involves the transplantation of facial skin, the nasal structure, the nose, the lips, the muscles of facial movement used for expression, the nerves that provide sensation, and, potentially, the bones that support the face. The recipient of a face transplant will take life-long medications to suppress the immune system and fight off rejection.

The world's first partial face transplant on a living human was carried out in France in 2005. The world's first full face transplant was completed in Spain in 2010. Turkey, France, the United States and Spain (in order of total number of successful face transplants performed) are considered the leading countries in the research into the procedure.

Beneficiaries of face transplant
People with faces disfigured by trauma, burns, disease, or birth defects might aesthetically benefit from the procedure. Professor Peter Butler at the Royal Free Hospital first suggested this approach in treating people with facial disfigurement in a Lancet article in 2002. This suggestion caused considerable debate at the time concerning the ethics of this procedure.

An alternative to a face transplant is facial reconstruction, which typically involves moving the patient's own skin from their back, buttocks, thighs, or chest to their face in a series of as many as 50 operations to regain even limited functionality, and a face that is often likened to a mask or a living quilt.

History

Self as donor ("face replant")
The world's first full-face replant operation was on 9-year-old Sandeep Kaur, whose face was ripped off when her hair was caught in a thresher. Sandeep's mother witnessed the accident. Sandeep arrived at the hospital unconscious with her face in two pieces in a plastic bag. An article in The Guardian recounts: "In 1994, a nine-year-old child in northern India lost her face and scalp in a threshing machine accident. Her parents raced to the hospital with her face in a plastic bag and a surgeon managed to reconnect the arteries and replant the skin." The operation was successful, although the child was left with some muscle damage as well as scarring around the perimeter where the facial skin was sutured back on. Sandeep's doctor was Abraham Thomas, one of India's top microsurgeons. In 2004, Sandeep was training to be a nurse.

In 1996, a similar operation was performed in the Australian state of Victoria, when a woman's face and scalp, torn off in a similar accident, was packed in ice and successfully reattached.

Partial face transplant

France
The world's first partial face transplant on a living human was carried out on 27 November 2005 by Bernard Devauchelle, an oral and maxillofacial surgeon, Benoit Lengelé, a Belgian plastic surgeon, and Jean-Michel Dubernard in Amiens, France. Isabelle Dinoire underwent surgery to replace her original face, which had been mauled by her dog. A triangle of face tissue from a brain-dead woman's nose and mouth was grafted onto the patient. On 13 December 2007, the first detailed report of the progress of this transplant after 18 months was released in the New England Journal of Medicine and documents that the patient was happy with the results but also that the journey has been very difficult, especially with respect to her immune system's response. Dinoire died on 22 April 2016
at the age of 49 following cancer from medications.

A 29-year-old French man underwent surgery in 2007. He had a facial tumor called a neurofibroma caused by a genetic disorder. The tumor was so massive that the man could not eat or speak properly.

In March 2008, the treatment of 30-year-old Pascal Coler of France, who has neurofibromatosis, ended after he received what his doctors call the world's first successful almost full face transplant. The operation, which lasted approximately 20 hours, was designed and performed by Laurent Lantieri and his team (Jean-Paul Meningaud, Antonios Paraskevas and Fabio Ingallina).

China
In April 2006, Guo Shuzhong at the Xijing military hospital in Xi'an, transplanted the cheek, upper lip, and nose of Li Guoxing, who was mauled by an Asiatic black bear while protecting his sheep. On 21 December 2008, it was reported that Li had died in July in his home village in Yunnan. Prior to his death, a documentary on the Discovery Channel showed he had stopped taking immuno-suppressant drugs in favour of herbal medication; a decision that was likely a contributing factor to his death, according to his surgeon.

Turkey
Selahattin Özmen performed a partial face transplant on 17 March 2012 on Hatice Nergis, a twenty-year-old woman at Gazi University's hospital in Ankara. It was Turkey's third, the first woman-to-woman and the first three-dimensional with bone tissue. The patient from Kahramanmaraş had lost her upper jaw six years prior in a firearm accident, including her mouth, lips, palate, teeth and nasal cavity, and was since then unable to eat. She had undergone around 35 reconstructive plastic surgery operations. The donor was a 28-year-old Turkish woman of Moldavian origin in Istanbul, who had died by suicide. Nergis died in Ankara on 15 November 2016 after she was hospitalized two days prior complaining about acute pain.

Belgium
In December 2011, a 54-year-old man underwent a partial face transplant to the lower two-thirds of the face (including bone) after a ballistic accident. The operation was performed by a multidisciplinary team led by plastic surgeon Phillip Blondeel; Hubert Vermeersch, Nathalie Roche and Filip Stillaert were other members of the surgical team. For the first time 3D CT planning was used to plan the operation that lasted 20 hours. The patient is alive, functional doing well and has a full reintegrated life in society.

Italy 
In September 2018, a 49-year-old woman affected by Neurofibromatosis type I received a partial face transplant from a 21-year-old girl at Sant'Andrea Hospital of Sapienza University in Rome. The procedure took 27 hours and was carried out by two teams led by Fabio Santanelli di Pompeo and Benedetto Longo. Unfortunately, the patient had a complication and after two days the surgeons had to replace the facial graft with autologous tissue. The patient is still alive and waiting for a second face transplantation.

Canada 
In May 2018, the first Canadian complete face transplant was performed under the leadership of plastic surgeon Daniel Borsuk at the Hopital Maisonneuve Rosemont, in Montreal, Quebec. The transplant took over 30 hours and replaced the upper and lower jaws, nose, lips and teeth on Maurice Desjardins, a 64-year-old man that shot himself in a hunting accident. At that time, Mr. Desjardins was the oldest person to benefit from a face transplant.

Full face transplant
On 20 March 2010, a team of 30 Spanish doctors led by plastic surgeon Joan Pere Barret at the Vall d'Hebron University Hospital in Barcelona carried out the first full face transplant, on a man injured in a shooting accident. It became the first full face transplant in the world.

On 8 July 2010, the French media reported that a full face transplant, including tear ducts and eyelids, was carried out at the Henri-Mondor hospital in Créteil.

In March 2011, a surgical team, led by Bohdan Pomahač at Brigham and Women's Hospital in Boston, Massachusetts, performed a full face transplant on Dallas Wiens who was badly disfigured in a power line accident that left him blind and without lips, nose or eyebrows. The patient's sight couldn't be recovered but he has been able to talk on the phone and smell.

In April 2011, less than one month after the hospital performed the first full face transplant in the country, the Brigham and Women's Hospital face transplant team, led by Bohdan Pomahač, performed the nation's second full face transplant on patient Mitch Hunter of Speedway, Indiana. It was the third face transplant procedure to be performed at BWH and the fourth face transplant in the country. The team of more than 30 physicians, nurses, anesthesiologists and residents worked for more than 14 hours to replace the full facial area of patient Mitch Hunter, 30, of Indiana, including the nose, muscles of facial animation and the nerves that power them and provide sensation. Hunter had a severe shock from a high voltage electrical wire following a car accident in 2001.

Poland

On 15 May 2013, at the Maria Skłodowska-Curie Institute of Oncology branch in Gliwice, Poland, an entire face was transplanted onto a male patient, Grzegorz (aged 33) after he lost the front of his head in a machine accident at work. The surgery took 27 hours and was directed by Professor Adam Maciejewski. There had not been much planning or prep time before the surgery, which was performed about one month after the accident, because the transplantation was done as an urgent life-saving surgery due to the patient's difficulty in eating and breathing. Shortly after the donor's death, the decision to perform the surgery was made and his body was transported hundreds of kilometers to Gliwice once his relatives gave their consent. The doctors believe that their patient has an excellent chance to live a normal, active life after surgery, and that his face should operate more or less normally (his eyes survived the accident untouched).

Seven months later, on 4 December, the same Polish medical team in Gliwice transplanted a face onto 26-year-old female patient with neurofibromatosis. Two months after the operation, she left the hospital.

Turkey
On 21 January 2012, Turkish surgeon Ömer Özkan and his team successfully performed a full face transplant at Akdeniz University's hospital in Antalya. The 19-year-old patient, Uğur Acar, was badly burnt in a house fire when he was a baby. The donor was 39-year-old Ahmet Kaya, who died on 20 January. The Turkish doctors declared that his body had accepted the new tissue.

Almost one month later on 24 February 2012, a surgical team led by Serdar Nasır conducted the country's second successful full face transplant at Hacettepe University's hospital in Ankara on 25-year-old Cengiz Gül. The patient's face was badly burned in a television tube implosion accident when he was two years old. The donor was 40-year-old N. A. (his family did not permit the identity of the donor to be revealed), who experienced brain death two days before the surgery following a motorcycle accident that occurred on 17 February.

On 16 May 2012, surgeon Ömer Özkan and his team at the Akdeniz University Hospital performed the country's fourth and their second full face transplant. The face and ears of 27-year-old patient Turan Çolak from Izmir were burnt when he fell into an oven when he was three and half years old. The donor was Tevfik Yılmaz, a 19-year-old man from Uşak who had attempted suicide on 8 May. He was declared brain dead in the evening hours of 15 May after having been in intensive care for seven days. His parents donated all his organs.

On 18 July 2013, the face of a Polish man was successfully given to a Turkish man in a transplant performed by Özkan, at Akdeniz University hospital following a 6.5-hour operation, making it the fifth such operation to take place in the country. It was the 25th face transplant operation in the world. The donor was Andrzej Kucza, a 42-year-old Polish tourist who was declared brain dead following a heart attack on 14 July while swimming in Turkey's sea resort Muğla. The 27-year-old patient Recep Sert came immediately from Bursa to Antalya for the surgery in late July 2017.

On 23 August 2013, surgeon Ömer Özkan and his team at Akdeniz University performed the sixth face transplant surgery in Turkey. Salih Üstün (54) received the scalp, eyelids, jaw and maxilla, nose and the half tongue of 31-year-old Muhittin Turan, who was declared brain dead after a motorcycle accident that took place two days before.

On 30 December 2013, Özkan and his team conducted their fifth and Turkey's seventh face transplant surgery at the hospital of Akdeniz University. The nose, upper lip, upper jaw and maxilla of brain dead Ali Emre Küçük, aged 34, were successfully transplanted to 22-year-old Recep Kaya, whose face was badly deformed in a shotgun accident. While Kaya was flown from Kırklareli to Antalya via Istanbul in four hours, the donor's organs were transported from Edirne by an ambulance airplane. The surgery took 4 hours and 10 minutes.

United Kingdom

In October 2006, surgeon Peter Butler at London's Royal Free Hospital in the UK was given permission by the NHS ethics board to carry out face transplants. His team will select four adult patients (children cannot be selected due to concerns over consent), with operations being carried out at six-month intervals.

United States

In 2004, the Cleveland Clinic became the first institution to approve this surgery and test it on cadavers.

In 2005, the Cleveland Clinic became the first US hospital to approve the procedure. In December 2008, a team at the Cleveland Clinic, led by Maria Siemionow and including a group of supporting doctors and six plastic surgeons (Steven Bernard, Dr Mark Hendrickson, Robert Lohman, Dan Alam and Francis Papay) performed the first face transplant in the US on a woman named Connie Culp. It was the world's first near-total facial transplant and the fourth known facial transplant to have been successfully performed to date. This operation was the first facial transplant known to have included bones, along with muscle, skin, blood vessels, and nerves. The woman received a nose, most of the sinuses around the nose, the upper jaw, and even some teeth from a brain-dead donor. As doctors recovered the donor's facial tissue, they paid special attention to maintaining arteries, veins, and nerves, as well as soft tissue and bony structures. The surgeons then connected facial graft vessels to the patient's blood vessels in order to restore blood circulation in the reconstructed face before connecting arteries, veins and nerves in the 22-hour procedure. She had been disfigured to the point where she could not eat or breathe on her own as a result of a traumatic injury several years ago, which had left her without a nose, right eye and upper jaw. Doctors hoped the operation would allow her to regain her sense of smell and ability to smile, and said she had a "clear understanding" of the risks involved. Connie died July 29, 2020.
The second partial face transplant in the US took place at Brigham and Women's Hospital in Boston on 9 April 2009. During a 17-hour operation, a surgical team led by Bohdan Pomahač, replaced the nose, upper lip, cheeks, and roof of the mouth – along with corresponding muscles, bones and nerves – of James Maki, age 59. Maki's face was severely injured after falling onto the electrified third rail at a Boston subway station in 2005. In May 2009, he made a public media appearance and declared he was happy with the result. This procedure was also shown in the eighth episode of the ABC documentary series Boston Med.

The first full face transplant performed in the US was done on a construction worker named Dallas Wiens in March 2011. He was burned in an electrical accident in 2008. This operation, performed by Bohdan Pomahač and BWH plastic surgery team, was paid for with the help of the US defense department. They hope to learn from this procedure and use what they learn to help soldiers with facial injuries. One of the top benefits of the surgery was that Dallas has regained his sense of smell.

The Brigham and Women's Hospital transplant team led by Bohdan Pomahač, performed the nation's second full face transplant on patient Mitch Hunter of Speedway, Indiana. Hunter, who is a US war veteran, was left disfigured in a car accident, burning about 94% of his face. It was the third face transplant procedure to be performed at BWH and the fourth face transplant in the country. The team of more than 30 physicians, nurses, anesthesiologists and residents worked for more than 14 hours to replace the full facial area of patient Mitch Hunter including the nose, eyelids, muscles of facial animation and the nerves that power them and provide sensation. Mitch Hunter was a passenger in a single cab pick-up truck, upon exiting the vehicle and pulling another passenger off a downed line, Hunter was then struck by a 10,000-volt 7-amp power line for a little under five minutes. The electricity entered his lower left leg, with the majority exiting his face, leaving him severely disfigured. He also lost part of his lower left leg, below the knee, and lost two digits on his right hand (pinkie and ring finger). Hunter has regained almost 100% of his normal sensation back in his face and his only complaint is that he looks too much like his older brother.

57-year-old Charla Nash, who was mauled by a chimpanzee named Travis in 2009, after the owner gave the chimp Xanax and wine. She underwent a 20-hour full face transplant in May 2011 at Brigham and Women's Hospital in Boston. Nash's full face transplant was the third surgery of its kind performed in the United States, all at the same hospital.

In March 2012, a face transplant was completed at the University of Maryland Medical Center and R Adams Cowley Shock Trauma Center under the leadership of plastic surgeon Eduardo Rodriguez and his team (Amir Dorafshar, Michael Christy, Branko Bojovic and Daniel Borsuk). The recipient was 37-year-old Richard Norris, who had sustained a facial gunshot injury in 1997. This transplant included all facial and anterior neck skin, both jaws, and the tongue.

In September 2014, another face transplant was performed by the Cleveland Clinic group. The patient had had complex trauma that masked the development of a rare type of autoimmune disease (granulomatosis with polyangiitis and pyoderma gengrenosum) affecting the face. It was the first face transplant in a patient with an autoimmune disease involving the craniofacial region. Prior to surgery, an analysis of renal transplant outcomes in granulomatosis with polyangiitis was conducted to evaluate allograft outcomes in these cohorts. That literature established feasibility and encouraged the Cleveland Clinic team to proceed with the surgery. The intervention was reported successful up to three years post-transplantation.

In August 2015, a face transplant was completed at the NYU Langone Medical Center under the leadership of the chair of plastic surgery Eduardo D. Rodriguez and his team. A 41-year-old retired fireman named Patrick Hardison received the face of cyclist David Rodebaugh.

In June 2016, a multidisciplinary team of surgeons, physicians and other health professionals completed a near-total face transplant at Mayo Clinic's Rochester campus. Patient Andrew Sandness, a 32-year-old from eastern Wyoming, had devastating facial injuries from a self-inflicted gunshot wound in 2006. The surgery, which spanned more than 50 hours, restored Sandness' nose, upper and lower jaw, palate, teeth, cheeks, facial muscles, oral mucosa, some of the salivary glands and the skin of his face (from below the eyelids to the neck and from ear to ear). The care team led by Samir Mardini, and Hatem Amer, the surgical director and medical director, respectively, for the Mayo Clinic Essam and Dalal Obaid Center for Reconstructive Transplant Surgery, devoted more than 50 Saturdays over  years to rehearsing the surgery, using sets of cadaver heads to transplant the face of one to the other. They used 3-D imaging and virtual surgery to plot out the bony cuts so the donor's face would fit perfectly on the transplant recipient. Today, in addition to his physical transformation, Sandness can smell again, breathe normally and eat foods that were off-limits for a decade.

In a 31-hour operation starting on 4 May 2017, surgeons at the Cleveland Clinic transplanted a face donated from Adrea Schneider, who had died of a drug overdose, to Katie Stubblefield, whose face had been disfigured in a suicide attempt by rifle on 25 March 2014. , Katie is the youngest person in the United States to have had a face transplant, age 21 at the time. Surgeons originally planned to leave her cheeks, eyebrows, eyelids, most of her forehead, and the sides of her face alone. However, because the donor face was larger and darker than Katie's, they made the decision to transplant the donor's full face. This holds the risk that in case of acute rejection in which the face must be removed, she would not have enough tissue for reconstructive surgery. Katie was featured on the cover of National Geographic in September 2018 for an article entitled "The Story of a Face."

In July 2019, 68-year-old Robert Chelsea became the oldest person, as well as the first black person, to receive a full face transplant. It was performed at Brigham and Women's Hospital.

Combined procedures 
A number of combined VCA procedures, such as bilateral hand transplants, have been described in the literature and media sources. These combined procedures also include attempts at triple-limb and quadruple-limb transplants, however, only three face transplants have been attempted in combination with other allografts.

France 
In 2009, Laurent Lantieri and his team attempted a face and bilateral hand transplant on a 37-year-old man who sustained extensive injuries during a self-immolation attempt one year prior. The patient ultimately died of anoxic brain injury two months after his initial transplant during surgical management of infectious and vascular complications. Autopsy revealed no signs of rejection in any of the allografts.

United States 
On August 12, 2020, at NYU Langone Health in New York, New York, Eduardo D. Rodriguez led a team of over 140 personnel in successfully transplanting the face and bilateral hands of a brain dead donor onto 22-year-old Joe DiMeo, who sustained disfiguring burns after a car accident in 2018. The procedure lasted approximately 23 hours, and involved the entire facial soft tissue (extending from the anterior hairline to the neck, including the eyelids, nose, lips, and ears, along with strategic skeletal components), as well as both hands at the distal forearm level.

Charla Nash's face transplant, described above, also initially included bilateral hands from the same donor. Circulation to Nash's transplanted hands was compromised after she was started on vasopressors as part of treatment for sepsis. The hands were ultimately amputated, however the patient survived, as did her facial allograft.

Ethics, surgery and post-operation treatment
The procedure consists of a series of operations requiring rotating teams of specialists. With issues of tissue type, age, sex, and skin color taken into consideration, the patient's face is removed and replaced (sometimes including the underlying fat, nerves, blood vessels, bones, and/or musculature). The surgery may last anywhere from 8 to 36 hours, followed by a 10- to 14-day hospital stay.

There has been a substantial amount of ethical debate surrounding the operation and its performance. The main issue is that, as noted below, the procedure entails submitting otherwise physically healthy people to potentially fatal, lifelong immunosuppressant therapy. So far, four people have died of complications related to the procedure. Citing the comments of various plastic surgeons and medical professionals from France and Mexico, anthropologist Samuel Taylor-Alexander suggests that the operation has been infused with nationalist import, which is ultimately influencing the decision-making and ethical judgements of the involved parties. His most recent research suggests the face transplant community needs to do more in order to ensure that the experiential knowledge of face transplant recipients is included in the ongoing evaluation of the field. As of October 2019, the AboutFace Project, funded by a UKRI Future Leaders Fellowship awarded to Dr Fay Bound Alberti, is exploring these debates as part of its wider research into the emotional and cultural history of face transplants.

After the procedure, a lifelong regimen of immunosuppressive drugs is necessary to suppress the patient's own immune systems and prevent rejection. Long-term immunosuppression increases the risk of developing life-threatening infections, kidney damage, and cancer. The surgery may result in complications such as infections that could damage the transplanted face and require a second transplant or reconstruction with skin grafts.

Popular culture
 The procedure was envisioned in Georges Franju's 1960 cult horror film Les yeux sans visage, which translates to "Eyes Without a Face."
 Kōbō Abe, Japanese author and playwright, wrote The Face of Another (1964) about a plastics scientist who loses his face in an accident and proceeds to construct a new face for himself. With a new face, the protagonist sees the world in a new way and even goes so far as to have a clandestine "affair" with his estranged wife. This novel was made into a film of the same name by Hiroshi Teshigahara in 1966.
 In the 1990 Sam Raimi film Darkman, Liam Neeson plays a scientist who depends on his own face transplant technology, but finds that it only lasts for 99 minutes.
 The plot of the 1997 film Face/Off is based on a face transplant operation that involved switching the skin of the face, making the transplant recipient look indistinguishable from the donor, with immediate and complete use of the transplanted tissue. In the film, the transplant is shown to be reversible, with the patient being able to replace his original face.
 In the episode "Faces" from Season 2 of The Good Doctor (2019), a teenaged girl whose face was disfigured in an accident receives a full face transplant from a brain dead girl.
 The 2019 Tamil movie Boomerang plot line has the lead character undergoing a face transplant.

References

External links

 Cleveland Clinic Face Transplant Video and Surgery Fact Sheet

Tissue transplants
Organ transplantation
Plastic surgical procedures
Oral and maxillofacial surgery
French inventions